Jean-Louis Viale (January 22, 1933, Neuilly-sur-Seine - May 10, 1984, Paris) was a French jazz drummer.

Viale played early in his career with Sacha Distel and Rene Urtreger, then took a gig at the club Le Tabou in Paris, playing with Jimmy Gourley, Bobby Jaspar, and Henri Renaud. He also played at the Club Saint-Germain in the early 1950s. He worked with Distel regularly through the 1950s and played with Clifford Brown, Frank Foster, Stan Getz, Stephane Grappelli, Gigi Gryce, Thelonious Monk, Jimmy Raney, Django Reinhardt, Zoot Sims, Martial Solal, René Thomas, George Wallington, Barney Wilen, and Lester Young. In the early and mid-1960s he worked often as a sideman and session musician, with Raymond Fol, Johnny Griffin, Roger Guerin, Ivan Jullien, and Eddy Louiss, but was involved in a car crash in 1968 which temporarily sidelined his career. He returned in 1969 to work again with Rene Thomas and Stephane Grappelli, as well as with Jim Hall and Barney Kessel. In the 1970s he worked with Benny Bailey, Jack Dieval, Johnny Hammond Smith, and Slide Hampton, as well as with Rene Urtreger on several occasions.

References
André Clergeat/Barry Kernfeld, "Jean-Louis Viale". The New Grove Dictionary of Jazz. 2nd edition, 2001.

French jazz drummers
Male drummers
1933 births
1984 deaths
French male jazz musicians
20th-century French male musicians